Dear is the first mini-album from Shion Miyawaki under the label Rhythm Zone. The album failed to chart on the Oricon chart. This mini-album includes a collaboration song with DJ MAKAI.

The DVD includes a PV of the song Flavor and a memorial video of the 1000 CD project which features the song You're Butterfly.

Track listing
CD
 Flavor
 You're Butterfly -MAKAI original mix-
 STORY
 Soba ni Itai (そばにいたい; Want to be around)
 Touch Me
 Flavor feat. BABE.RYOTA(0 SOUL 7) -Longest Summer Groove mix-

DVD
 Flavor PV
 You’re Butterfly MEMORIAL MUSIC VIDEO

References

2008 albums
Shion Miyawaki albums